U-67 may refer to one of the following German submarines:

 , a Type U 66 submarine launched in 1915 and that served in the First World War until surrendered on 20 November 1918; broken up at Fareham in 1921
 During the First World War, Germany also had these submarines with similar names:
 , a Type UB III submarine launched in 1917 and surrendered on 24 November 1918; broken up at Swansea in 1922
 , a Type UC II submarine launched in 1916 and surrendered on 16 January 1919; broken up at Briton Ferry in 1919–20
 , a Type IXC submarine that served in the Second World War until sunk on 16 July 1943

Submarines of Germany